Patricia Morrison (born 1962) is an American bass guitarist, singer and songwriter.

Patricia Morrison (or Morison) may also refer to:

 Patricia Morison (1915–2018), American actress/singer
 Patricia Kennealy-Morrison (1946–2021), American author
 Patt Morrison (born 1952), American journalist

See also